Super Bowl XXXIV was an American football game played at the Georgia Dome in Atlanta on January 30, 2000, to determine the National Football League (NFL) champion for the 1999 season. The National Football Conference (NFC) champion St. Louis Rams defeated the American Football Conference (AFC) champion Tennessee Titans 23–16 to claim their first Super Bowl win and first NFL championship since 1951. To date, it is the most recent NFL championship in which both teams were seeking their first Super Bowl title.

The game featured teams both returning to the postseason after a period of struggles and relocation. Led by The Greatest Show on Turf offense, the Rams entered their second Super Bowl appearance with an NFC-best 13–3 regular season record. Their season marked the franchise's first playoff run since 1989 and first since relocating from Los Angeles to St. Louis. The Titans also finished the regular season with a 13–3 record and advanced to their Super Bowl debut as a wild card. In their first season after retiring the franchise's original Oilers name, the Titans were making their first playoff run since 1993 and first since relocating from Houston to Tennessee.

Largely a defensive battle during the first half, the Rams converted three field goals by halftime and scored a third quarter touchdown to take a 16–0 lead. The Titans responded by scoring 16 straight points to tie the game near the end of regulation, the then-largest deficit to be erased in a Super Bowl and first greater than 10 points. On their ensuing drive, the Rams regained the lead off wide receiver Isaac Bruce's 73-yard touchdown. Super Bowl XXXIV became best remembered for its final play, in which the Titans reached St. Louis' 10-yard line with six seconds remaining, but linebacker Mike Jones tackled wide receiver Kevin Dyson one yard short of the goal line to prevent a potential game-tying touchdown. The play became known as "One Yard Short" and "The Tackle". Rams quarterback Kurt Warner, who was the first undrafted quarterback and first first-year starter to win a Super Bowl, was named Super Bowl MVP after setting the Super Bowl records for passing yards and pass attempts without an interception. He became the sixth player to win both Super Bowl MVP and NFL MVP during the same season and was the last to do so for the next 23 seasons.

The game has been referred to as the "Dot-com Super Bowl" due to the large amount of advertisements purchased by dot-com companies. Regarded as one of the greatest Super Bowls of all time, it was featured on NFL's Greatest Games as "The Longest Yard".

Background
NFL owners awarded Super Bowl XXXIV to Atlanta during their October 31, 1996, meeting held in New Orleans. Other cities under consideration were Miami, Tampa, and Los Angeles. Owners initially planned on selecting only two hosts (XXXIII and XXXIV), but decided to name three after strong showings by the respective delegations. Miami, Atlanta, and Tampa were selected to host XXXIII, XXXIV, and XXXV.

St. Louis Rams

The Rams entered 1999 having been among the league's stragglers for a decade. The reasons are many, including, some suggest, mismanagement by executive John Shaw. The franchise moved to a taxpayer-funded stadium in St. Louis, Missouri for the 1995 season, but continued to struggle. In 1997, the team hired Dick Vermeil as their head coach, bringing him back to the NFL after 15 years of retirement. Vermeil had previously turned the Philadelphia Eagles from one of the worst teams in the league into a Super Bowl team in 1980, but his first two seasons in St. Louis were hardly stellar, winning just five games in 1997 and four in 1998.

Little was expected of the Rams for 1999. Indeed, ESPN The Magazines 1999 NFL preview predicted the Rams would be the worst team in the NFL, worse even than the Cleveland Browns, who had returned as an expansion team that year. Trent Green, who had just been signed as the Rams starting quarterback, suffered a season-ending knee injury in the preseason, making undrafted quarterback Kurt Warner the team's new starter. Warner, who started the season as a backup to Green, had previously played for the Iowa Barnstormers of the Arena Football League and the Amsterdam Admirals of NFL Europe.

The Rams proceeded to shock the NFL with an NFC-best 13–3 regular season record and outscored their opponents 526–242, the highest scoring margin (284) of any Super Bowl champion.

The Rams' high-powered offense, run by offensive coordinator Mike Martz, was nicknamed "The Greatest Show on Turf". In Warner's first NFL season in 1998, he played only one game and threw just 11 passes. But in 1999, he experienced one of the most spectacular seasons ever by a quarterback, recording a passer rating of 109.2, completing 65.1 percent of his passes for 4,353 yards, 41 touchdowns, and just 13 interceptions, and earning the NFL Most Valuable Player Award. Besides Warner, several other Rams compiled significant statistics. Halfback Marshall Faulk, in his first year in St. Louis after spending five seasons with Indianapolis, had the best season of his career and won the NFL Offensive Player of the Year Award, while finishing second in MVP voting to Warner. He scored 12 touchdowns, rushed for 1,381 yards, and recorded a team-leading 87 receptions for 1,048 yards. In all, Faulk gained a record 2,429 total yards and became just the second running back in NFL history to gain over 1,000 yards rushing and receiving in the same season (Roger Craig was the first to do it, in 1985). Faulk held the NFL record for yards from scrimmage in a single season until Tennessee's Chris Johnson broke it in 2009. Faulk wasn’t the only weapon at Warner's disposal in 1999. Veteran receiver Isaac Bruce was the top Rams receiver with 77 receptions for 1,165 yards and 12 touchdowns. while breakout rookie wide receiver Torry Holt recorded 52 receptions, 788 yards, and 6 touchdowns. Even the team's third wide receiver, Az-Zahir Hakim, was a big contributor by catching 36 passes for 677 yards and 8 touchdowns, while also returning punts for 461 yards and another touchdown. The Rams' offensive line was led by Pro Bowlers Orlando Pace and Adam Timmerman. Timmerman, acquired by the Rams in 1999, had previously won Super Bowl XXXI with the Green Bay Packers. On special teams, receiver Tony Horne returned 30 kickoffs for 892 yards and 2 touchdowns, giving him an NFL-leading 29.7 yards per return average. Overall, St. Louis's offense led the league in total yards gained (6,639), scoring (526 points), and passing touchdowns (42).

The Rams' defense led the league in fewest rushing yards allowed (1,189) and fewest rushing touchdowns allowed (4), while giving up just 242 points. Overall, the defense ranked 4th in the league in fewest total yards (5,056). The line was anchored by Pro Bowl defensive end Kevin Carter and defensive end Grant Wistrom. Carter led the league with 17 sacks, while Wistrom recorded 8.5 sacks and 2 interceptions, returning both for touchdowns and a combined total of 131 yards. Behind them, the Rams had three linebackers: London Fletcher (66 tackles and 3 sacks), Mike Jones (4 interceptions for 96 return yards and 2 touchdowns, and 2 fumble recoveries for 51 return yards and a touchdown), and Todd Collins (72 tackles, a sack, and 2 interceptions for 16 yards). The secondary was led by Pro Bowler Todd Lyght (6 interceptions), Dexter McCleon (4 interceptions), and rookie Dré Bly (3 interceptions).

This was the Rams' first playoff appearance since 1989 and only the second Super Bowl appearance in team history.

Tennessee Titans

The Titans advanced to their first Super Bowl in team history, after originating as a charter member of the American Football League. From 1960 to 1996, the team was owned by Houston, Texas businessman Bud Adams and known as the Houston Oilers. By 1995, however, Adams, like Frontiere, was lured to move his team from Houston, in this case to a new stadium in Nashville, Tennessee. Since this new stadium was not ready until the 1999 season, Adams decided to move his team to Liberty Bowl Memorial Stadium in Memphis, Tennessee in 1997 after playing before small Houston crowds in 1996.

The renamed Tennessee Oilers also played before sparse Memphis crowds, and thus spent the 1998 season playing at Nashville's Vanderbilt Stadium. After the new Adelphia Coliseum (now known as Nissan Stadium) was completed in 1999, the team's name was changed to Tennessee Titans. With Tennessee's Super Bowl appearance, every former AFL team had now played in the Super Bowl, including the original eight AFL teams and two AFL expansion teams: the Miami Dolphins and the Cincinnati Bengals.

The 1999 Titans were led by quarterback Steve McNair and running back Eddie George. McNair had missed five games due to injuries during the season, but he was still able to put up solid numbers, throwing for 2,179 yards and 12 touchdowns with 8 interceptions. Despite his injury problems, McNair finished the season as the second-leading rusher on the team with 337 yards and 8 touchdowns. When McNair was out with injuries, the team was able to rely on backup QB Neil O'Donnell, who threw for 1,382 yards and 10 touchdowns, with only 5 interceptions. George also had an outstanding season, rushing for 1,304 yards, and catching 47 passes for 458 yards (his receptions, receiving yards, and receiving touchdowns were all career highs). In all, George scored a grand total of 13 touchdowns, and was selected to play in the Pro Bowl for the 3rd consecutive year.

Another contributor on the Titans' offense was fullback Lorenzo Neal, who frequently served as George's lead blocker and was widely considered one of the best blocking backs in the league. The team did not have any outstanding deep threats, but wide receiver Yancey Thigpen recorded 38 receptions for 648 yards, wide receiver Kevin Dyson had 54 receptions for 658 yards, and tight end Frank Wycheck caught 69 passes for 641 yards. Thigpen, however, would not play in the Super Bowl because of a right foot fracture he suffered in the AFC Championship Game. Up front, their line was anchored by Pro Bowl tackle Bruce Matthews. On special teams, speedy rookie Derrick Mason racked up 1,030 combined return yards and a touchdown.

Tennessee's defense was also extremely effective. Pro Bowl defensive end Jevon Kearse anchored the line, recording 14.5 sacks to go along with 8 forced fumbles and was named the NFL's Defensive Rookie of the Year. The linebackers corps was led by Eddie Robinson, who recorded 64 tackles and 6 sacks, while also recovering and forcing 3 fumbles. Their secondary was led by cornerback Samari Rolle, who led the team with 4 interceptions.

The Titans finished the regular season with a 13–3 record (including a home win over the Rams), but finished second behind the 14–2 Jacksonville Jaguars in the AFC Central. The Jaguars' only two losses were to the Titans, but Tennessee's three losses forced them to enter the playoffs as a wild-card team.

Playoffs

Playing in his first ever NFL playoff game, Warner threw for 395 yards and 5 touchdowns, with 1 interception, as the Rams defeated the Minnesota Vikings, 49–37 in St. Louis, by scoring 35 unanswered points in the second half. Bruce caught 4 passes for 133 yards and a touchdown. Faulk gained 101 combined rushing/receiving yards and scored 2 touchdowns. Although Vikings quarterback Jeff George threw for 423 yards and 4 touchdowns, three of his scores occurred late in the 4th quarter, after the Rams had already put the game away.

The Rams then narrowly defeated the Tampa Bay Buccaneers, 11–6 at home, in a hard-fought defensive struggle in the NFC Championship Game. The first half ended with the Rams leading 5–3 on a Jeff Wilkins field goal and after a bad snap by the Buccaneers went through their own end zone for a safety. Tampa Bay then scored a field goal in the 3rd quarter to take the lead. But Warner threw a 30-yard go-ahead touchdown pass to receiver Ricky Proehl with 4:44 left in the game.

Meanwhile, the Titans started out their postseason by narrowly defeating the Buffalo Bills, 22–16 in Nashville, on a famous, trick kickoff return play that became known in NFL lore as the Music City Miracle. Tennessee jumped to a 12–0 halftime lead with an Al Del Greco field goal, a safety by Kearse, and a McNair touchdown run. However, Buffalo came back to take the lead, 13–12 with Antowain Smith's two touchdown runs in the second half (the two-point conversion after Smith's second touchdown failed). In the 4th quarter, the Titans regained the lead after Del Greco kicked his second field goal. With 16 seconds left in the game, Bills kicker Steve Christie made what seemed to be the game-winning 41-yard field goal to give his team the lead, 16–15. However, Neal received the ensuing kickoff and handed the ball off to Wycheck, who then lateraled the ball to Dyson on the other side of the field, who eventually ran 75 yards to the end zone for the game-winning touchdown. The play was reviewed to determine whether Wycheck had lateraled the ball to Dyson or made an illegal forward pass. Referee Phil Luckett upheld the original call on the field of a touchdown, giving Tennessee the win.

The Titans then defeated the Indianapolis Colts, 19–16 in Indianapolis. After both teams exchanged field goals in the first half, George scored on a 68-yard touchdown run to give his team a 13–9 lead. Del Greco then kicked two more field goals in the 4th quarter to put the game away. George finished the game with a franchise playoff record 162 rushing yards and a touchdown, while Del Greco made four field goals.

The Titans then eliminated the Jacksonville Jaguars, 33–14, in the AFC Championship Game at Jacksonville. The Jaguars finished the 1999 regular season with a league-best 14–2 record, and advanced to the AFC title game after crushing the Miami Dolphins 62–7 and limiting future Hall of Fame quarterback Dan Marino to just 11 of 25 completions for 95 yards and 1 touchdown, with 2 interceptions. However, Tennessee's defense dominated the Jaguars in the AFC Championship Game, forcing 6 turnovers. Jacksonville led 14–10 at halftime, but the Titans then scored 23 unanswered points on two touchdown runs by McNair, a safety, and Derrick Mason's 80-yard kickoff return for a touchdown. Although McNair passed for only 112 yards and one touchdown with one interception, he rushed for 91 yards and 2 touchdowns on 9 carries. George rushed for 86 yards and caught 3 passes for 19 yards.

Pre-game notes
In January 2000, two ice storms struck the Atlanta area within a week of each other. The second storm occurred during the week the Super Bowl was hosted. Despite the rare adverse weather conditions, city and state crews kept streets and sidewalks free of ice, and MARTA public transport kept running. The Atlanta region does not receive more ice storms than most other areas of the country, and Super Bowl XXXIV was played indoors and unaffected by the elements. But some residents believe the poor weather during Super Bowl week negatively impacted the city's chances of hosting another Super Bowl, including the bid it lost for Super Bowl XLIII. That bid included meteorological data showing the rarity of such storms in the area. They eventually got the bid to host Super Bowl LIII.

Nashville, home of the Titans, is also the midway point of the Atlanta-St. Louis highway corridor, which contains the entirety of Interstate 24, and uses Interstate 64 and Interstate 75 to complete the route.

It is the most recent Super Bowl in which neither team had already won a Super Bowl.

The Titans, as the designated home team, wore navy blue jerseys with white pants. The Rams wore white uniforms with yellow pants, which would be the final appearance for these uniforms before rebranding to a new Millennium Blue/New Century Gold combination the next season.

Television
ABC televised the game in the United States, with play-by-play announcer Al Michaels and color commentator Boomer Esiason. Chris Berman from Disney-owned corporate sibling ESPN hosted all the events. Berman was joined by fellow ESPN analyst Steve Young, while ESPN's Mike Tirico was on hand for the post-game presentation of the Vince Lombardi Trophy. Lesley Visser and Lynn Swann served as sideline reporters. This was Esiason's only Super Bowl with ABC Sports as part of the Monday Night Football team (and his only one as a color commentator on television). He would be fired a little over a month later in early March the reason being for his dismissal was simply his poor chemistry and hatred of Michaels (Michaels himself hated Esiason). Esiason would join the broadcasting team for Westwood One radio for the game played the following year in Tampa and would stay with them until Super Bowl LII when Esiason was dropped by Westwood One.

It was also the first Super Bowl to be aired in high definition and 5.1 Dolby Digital. ABC Sports chose to use the 720p format.

Ironically, the ABC affiliate in St. Louis, KDNL-TV, has been regarded as one of the network's weakest affiliates since joining the network in 1995. The previous ABC affiliate, KTVI, in contrast, was one of the strongest affiliates – it had become a Fox station in 1995, and thus, has televised the majority of the Rams' games in this period.

The game was later featured as one of the NFL's Greatest Games as The Longest Yard.

Commercials

This game is often referred to as the "dot-com" Super Bowl since it was held during the height of the dot-com bubble, and several Internet companies purchased television commercials. E-Trade ran a commercial featuring a chimpanzee dancing in an E-Trade T-shirt and the text "Well, we just wasted 2 million bucks". Lifeminders.com ran a commercial of plain typewritten text beginning with the line "This is the worst commercial on the Super Bowl. But it might be the best thing you see tonight." Pets.com famously paid millions for an advertisement featuring a sock puppet, though the company would collapse before the end of the year.

Entertainment
Pregame ceremonies
The pregame show featured a tribute to "The Great American Music of the 20th Century". Narrated by the Smothers Brothers, the show highlighted some of the unique American musical styles such as gospel, big band, classical, country and rock. Singers Tina Turner and Travis Tritt along with the Georgia Tech Marching Band and the Georgia Mass Choir performed during the show.

Country singer Faith Hill then sang the national anthem.

To celebrate the 30th anniversary of Super Bowl IV, the following participants of the game were featured during the coin toss ceremony: Bud Grant, Lamar Hunt, Bobby Bell, Paul Krause, Willie Lanier, Alan Page, and Jan Stenerud.

Halftime show

The E-Trade Super Bowl Halftime Show was produced by Disney and titled "Tapestry of Nations" after the Epcot parade of the same name. The show, narrated by actor Edward James Olmos, was inspired by the Walt Disney World Millennium Celebration. It featured a full symphony orchestra conducted by Steven Byess; a multi-generational, 80-person choir; and singers Phil Collins, Christina Aguilera, Enrique Iglesias, and Toni Braxton.

Game summary
First half
The two teams’ defenses seemed to dominate most of the first half. The Rams started the game out strong by taking the opening kickoff and marching to the Tennessee 17-yard line. But on third down, safety Blaine Bishop pressured quarterback Kurt Warner to throw an incomplete pass. Then the ensuing field goal attempt failed when punter/holder Mike Horan fumbled the snap. The Titans responded by moving the ball to the St. Louis 29-yard line, aided with running back Eddie George's 32-yard reception. However, they also came up empty after kicker Al Del Greco missed a 47-yard field goal attempt.

For the rest of the half, the Titans were forced to punt on all of their possessions. In contrast, the Rams were able to reach inside the Tennessee 20-yard line on all four of their remaining drives before halftime, but on each one, the Titans' defense forced St. Louis to settle for field goal attempts from kicker Jeff Wilkins, who was successful in making three of them, but missed one attempt from 34 yards. The Rams ended up leading at halftime, 9–0, but their scoring margin over the Titans seemed somewhat small, considering they drove into scoring range on every one of their first-half possessions and outgained Tennessee in total yards, 294–89.

Third quarter
Both teams' offenses started to get going in the second half. The Titans took the opening kickoff of the 3rd quarter and drove 43 yards to the St. Louis 29-yard line. But Tennessee remained scoreless after defensive back Todd Lyght blocked Del Greco's 47-yard field goal attempt. After that, Warner converted a third down situation with a completion to Marshall Faulk, then on the next two plays threw a 31-yard strike to wide receiver Isaac Bruce and a 16-yard completion to tight end Ernie Conwell before finishing the 68-yard drive with a 9-yard touchdown pass to Torry Holt, giving St. Louis a 16–0 lead. On the completion to Conwell, Bishop combined to make the tackle, but suffered a spinal injury and had to leave the game. The game was delayed for several minutes while Bishop was being treated.

Tennessee wide receiver Derrick Mason returned the ensuing kickoff 35 yards to the 34-yard line. From there, five runs by George good for 24 yards, three completions from quarterback Steve McNair to tight end Frank Wycheck for 15 yards and a run by McNair for two advanced the ball to the St. Louis 25-yard line. Then McNair scrambled 23 yards to the 2-yard line, setting up a 1-yard touchdown run by George two plays later. The touchdown cut the Titans' deficit to 16–6 after McNair's pass to Wycheck on the two-point conversion attempt fell incomplete.

Fourth quarter
The Titans' first score sparked them to rally. After forcing the Rams to punt on their ensuing possession, a pair of 21-yard completions from McNair to tight end Jackie Harris and wide receiver Isaac Byrd aided a 13-play, 79-yard drive that was capped by George's 2-yard touchdown run to make the score 16–13. The Tennessee defense then forced the Rams to a three-and-out, and Horan's 30-yard punt gave the Titans the ball back at their 47-yard line. The Titans' offense then drove only 28 yards on their ensuing possession, but it was close enough for Del Greco to attempt a 43-yard field goal. This time, Del Greco's kick was good, tying the score at 16–16 with just 2:12 left in the game. The 16-point deficit was the largest deficit to be erased in a Super Bowl and the first greater than 10 points. It was also the first time in any Super Bowl a team down double digits in the 4th quarter had tied the game.

Then on the Rams' first play of their ensuing drive, Warner threw a long pass that was caught at the Titans' 38-yard line by Bruce, who then ran it all the way into the end zone for a 73-yard touchdown to give St. Louis a 23–16 lead. Likewise, in the 1951 NFL Championship Game, quarterback Norm Van Brocklin's 73-yard game-winning touchdown pass to wide receiver Tom Fears broke a 17–17 tie in the fourth quarter and gave the Rams a seven-point victory to win the NFL title. Warner's touchdown pass to Bruce was his only completion of the 4th quarter.

The Titans took over the ball at their own 12-yard line with 1:48 left in the game after committing a holding penalty on the ensuing kickoff. McNair started out the drive with a pair of completions to Mason and Wycheck for gains of 9 and 7 yards to reach the 28-yard line. After an incomplete pass, defensive back Dré Bly's 15-yard face-mask penalty while tackling McNair on a 12-yard scramble gave the Titans a 1st down at the St. Louis 45-yard line. On the next play, St. Louis was penalized 5 yards for being offside, moving the ball to the 40-yard line with 59 seconds left. McNair ran for 2 yards, then threw a 7-yard completion to wide receiver Kevin Dyson. On the next play, Tennessee nearly lost the ball when Bly stepped in front of a pass intended for Mason, only to have it go right through his arms. Two plays later, with the Titans facing 3rd down and 5, McNair was hit by two Rams defenders, but he escaped and completed a 16-yard pass to Dyson to gain a 1st down at the Rams' 10-yard line. Tennessee then used up their final timeout with just six seconds left, giving them a chance for one last play to tie the game.

Final play

The game's final play from the Rams' 10-yard line has gone down in NFL history as "The Tackle" or "One Yard Short". Tennessee's plan was to use Wycheck as a decoy. The tight end would run straight up the field on the right side, to lure linebacker Mike Jones away from receiver Kevin Dyson. Dyson would then slant left through the middle of the field. With Wychek occupying Jones, McNair would pass the ball to Dyson, who would be open from about five yards out to run in for the score.

Jones, who was the Rams' defensive signal-caller, called a 77 Blast, a combination coverage that can be altered as the offense lines up. When the Titans came to the line, Rams safety Billy Jenkins called for three Rams players — he, Jones, and cornerback Dexter McCleon — to play zone coverage against Wychek and Dyson.

As the play began, everything appeared to go as planned. Jones initially ran with Wycheck up the field. But as the Rams linebacker reached the goal line, he glanced over his left shoulder and noticed an open Dyson catching the ball. Jones switched directions and wrapped up Dyson's legs about two and a half yards short of the end zone.

Both players went into a rolling motion as Dyson stretched his hand with the football towards the end zone, attempting to break the plane of the goal line and score. As the rolling motion came to an end with Jones on top of Dyson's legs, the receiver's shoulder touched the ground, making him down by contact with the ball just inches short of the goal line. At this point, there were 2 seconds left on the clock, but with no timeouts remaining, the Titans could not run another play before time expired and, therefore, the game was over. Had Dyson scored and the extra point been converted, it would have been the first Super Bowl to go into overtime. Alternatively, had Dyson scored, the Titans could have attempted a 2-point conversion for the outright win on the final play of the game.

Because the game had already seen the greatest comeback in Super Bowl history, "The Tackle" is considered one of the greatest and most exciting game-ending plays in modern NFL history. The image of Dyson stretching the ball to the goal line with Jones wrapped around him has become a staple of NFL highlights. ESPN.com ranked "The Tackle" as the 35th-greatest moment of the past 25 years in sports (as of 2007). NFL.com ranked the tackle as the fourth-greatest clutch moment in Super Bowl history. Fox Sports ranked it as the Greatest Clutch Play in Super Bowl History (as of 2007). Like Dallas Cowboys cornerback Larry Brown, Jones was included on the NFL Network's "Top 10 One-Hit Wonders" list (Jones was #10, Brown was #3), Jones also mirrored Brown in his solid if unspectacular career outside of his Super Bowl heroics.

After the game

After the game, many sports writers commented on Warner's rise from an unknown backup to a Super Bowl MVP, but Warner himself wasn't impressed by it. "How can you be in awe of something that you expect yourself to do?" Warner pointed out. "People think this season is the first time I touched a football; they don't realize I've been doing this for years – just not on this level, because I never got the chance. Sure, I had my tough times, but you don't sit there and say, 'Wow, I was stocking groceries five years ago, and look at me now.' You don't think about it, and when you do achieve something, you know luck has nothing to do with it."

However, he later told The New York Times "I guess it is sort of a storybook ending. When you think about where I was and where I am now, it seems pretty incredible."

Box score

Statistical overview
Bruce caught 6 passes for 162 yards (3rd highest) and a touchdown, an average of 27 yards per catch. Holt had 7 receptions for 109 yards (the most ever by a rookie in a Super Bowl) and a touchdown. Bruce and Holt became the fourth pair of teammates to each have over 100 yards receiving in a Super Bowl, joining the Steelers' John Stallworth and Lynn Swann in Super Bowl XIII, the Bengals' Cris Collinsworth and Dan Ross in Super Bowl XVI, and the Redskins' Gary Clark and Art Monk in Super Bowl XXVI.

Rams starting running back Marshall Faulk was held to just 17 rushing yards, but gained 90 receiving yards on 5 receptions. McNair set a Super Bowl record for rushing yards by a quarterback, recording 64 yards on 8 carries. He also completed 22 out of 36 passes for 214 yards. George finished the game with 95 rushing yards, 35 receiving yards, and 2 touchdowns. Harris was the top receiver for Tennessee with 7 catches for 64 yards. Mason returned 5 kickoffs for 122 yards, and caught 2 passes for 18 yards.

Rams coach Dick Vermeil became the oldest coach ever to win a Super Bowl (age 63). He also set the record for the longest amount of time between going to his first Super Bowl (Super Bowl XV in the 1980 season) to winning it for the first time.  He retired after this season, but came back in 2001 to coach the Kansas City Chiefs, finally retiring for good in 2005.

It was the second (and last) Super Bowl in which neither team committed any turnovers (after Super Bowl XXV).

The Rams became the first, and to date the only, NFL team to win a championship in three different cities. They won the 1945 NFL Championship Game while located in Cleveland, and the 1951 NFL Championship Game when they represented Los Angeles, and they would later return to Los Angeles in 2016 and would win Super Bowl LVI in 2021.

Final statistics
Sources: NFL.com Super Bowl XXXIV, Super Bowl XXXIV Play Finder StL, Super Bowl XXXIV Play Finder Ten, USA Today Super Bowl XXXIV Play by Play

Statistical comparison

Individual leaders

1Completions/attempts
2Carries
3Long gain
4Receptions
5Times targeted

Records set
The following records were set in Super Bowl XXXIV, according to the official NFL.com boxscore, the 2016 NFL Record & Fact Book and the Pro-Football-Reference.com game summary. Some of these records have since been surpassed in subsequent Super Bowl games.

Turnovers are defined as the number of times losing the ball on interceptions and fumbles.

Starting lineups
Source:

Officials
 Referee: Bob McElwee, #95 (third Super Bowl; previously worked XXII and XXVIII, the latter of which was the first Super Bowl played in Atlanta)
 Umpire: Ron Botchan, #110, fifth Super Bowl (XX, XXXVII, XXIX, XXI)
 Head Linesman: Earnie Frantz, #111, third Super Bowl (XXIV, XXXI)
 Line Judge: Byron Boston, #18, first Super Bowl 
 Field Judge: Al Jury, #106, fifth Super Bowl (XX, XXII, XXIV, XXVIII)
 Side Judge: Tom Fincken, #47, third Super Bowl (XXIX, XXXVI)
 Back Judge: Bill Leavy, #127, first Super Bowl (later officiated Super Bowl XL as referee)
 Alternate Referee: Walt Coleman, #65
 Alternate Umpire''': Bob Wagner, #100

Ron Botchan and Al Jury joined Tom Kelleher, Jack Fette and Bob Beeks as the only men to officiate five Super Bowls. Jury became the second African-American (after Beeks) to do so.

References

External links

 
 Super Bowl official website
 
 
 The Sporting News: History of the Super Bowl (Last accessed December 4, 2005)
 Super Bowl XXXIV at Pro Football Reference
 Super Bowl play-by-plays from USA Today'' (Last accessed September 28, 2005)

Super Bowl 034
1999 National Football League season
2000 in American football
2000 in American sports
2000 in sports in Georgia (U.S. state)
2000 in Atlanta
American football competitions in Atlanta
January 2000 sports events in the United States
St. Louis Rams postseason
Tennessee Titans postseason